Telothyriini is a tribe of bristle flies in the family Tachinidae.

Genera
Comatacta Coquillett, 1902
Euptilomyia Townsend, 1939
Eutelothyria Townsend, 1931
Floradalia Thompson, 1963
Ptilomyiopsis Townsend, 1933
Ptilomyoides Curran, 1928
Telothyria Wulp, 1890

References

Brachycera tribes
Dexiinae
Diptera of North America
Diptera of South America